Boris Sébastien Moltenis (born 8 May 1999) is a French professional footballer who plays as a centre-back for Wisła Kraków.

Club career
Moltenis is a youth product of the youth academy of FC Sochaux-Montbéliard having joined the club in 2014. On 19 October 2018, He made his professional debut with Sochaux in a 2–1 Ligue 2 win over ESTAC Troyes. On 27 October 2018, he signed his first professional contract with Sochaux for three seasons.

On 23 July 2021, Moltenis moved to Boulogne and signed a two-year contract.

On 31 August 2022, he joined Polish I liga side Wisła Kraków on a one-year contract with an extension option. On 15 March 2023, his deal was extended until June 2024 after Moltenis met the required minimum playing time condition set in his contract.

References

External links
 
 

1999 births
Living people
Sportspeople from Belfort
French footballers
Association football defenders
FC Sochaux-Montbéliard players
US Boulogne players
Wisła Kraków players
Ligue 2 players
Championnat National players
Championnat National 2 players
Championnat National 3 players
I liga players
Footballers from Bourgogne-Franche-Comté
French expatriate footballers
Expatriate footballers in Poland
French expatriate sportspeople in Poland